New York Athletic Club Men's Basketball Team is an independent basketball club representing the basketball department of The New York Athletic Club. Founded in 1952, the teams most recent accomplishment is winning back-to-back NACAD Championships, a tournament held for basketball teams part of large sporting clubs around the United States.

Club Roster 

 John Baumann (Columbia)
 Nate Brown (St. Peters '02)
 Pawel Buczak (Princeton)
 Zahir Carrington (Lehigh)
 Colin Cunningham (Holy Cross '09)
 Keenan Jeppesen (Brown '08)
 Nate Lubick (Georgetown '14)
 Mark MacDonald (Brown '08)
 Matt Minoff (Yale '04)
 Paul Vitelli (Yale '04)
 Basketball Chairman/Coach - Ross Burns (UMass '99)
 Asst. Coach - Tim Burns (George Mason '07)

External links
 NYAC Basketball
 The New York Athletic Club Home

New York Athletic Club
Basketball teams in New York City
Basketball teams in the United States
Basketball teams established in 1952